A leadership election was held by the United Malays National Organisation (UMNO) party on 11 May 2000. It was won by incumbent Prime Minister and President of UMNO, Mahathir Mohamad.

Supreme Council election results
Source

Permanent Chairman

Deputy Permanent Chairman

President

Deputy President

Vice Presidents

Supreme Council Members

See also
2004 Malaysian general election
Sixth Mahathir cabinet

References

2000 elections in Malaysia
United Malays National Organisation leadership election
United Malays National Organisation leadership elections